Explosive City is a 2004 Hong Kong action film written, produced and directed by Sam Leong and starring Simon Yam, Alex Fong, Hisako Shirata and Sonny Chiba.

Plot
Macau government official Kent Yung (Joe Cheung) who arrived in Hong Kong to attend an international conference. At the Hong Kong International Airport where he was speaking to the press, he was shot thrice by a mysterious woman (Hisako Shirata) who emerged from the crowd. As havoc ensues in the airport, Special Forces superintendent Charles Cheung (Simon Yam), whose squad was in charge of protecting Yung, gives chase to the woman who eventually falls down a building as loses her memory. This assassination attempt at the airport caused a great shock to the Hong Kong police and CID chief inspector Tim Yiu (Alex Fong) was sent to assist Cheung in the investigation.  After investigation, the assassin, named Jade, belongs to an international terrorist organization. According to the information, Jade was born into a happy family in Japan, but at the age of three, she was abducted by the leader of the terrorist group, Otosan (Sonny Chiba), where she was brainwashed and trained to become an elite assassin. For this assassination attempt, she snuck into airport as a reporter in order to get close to her target.

While the Hong Kong police was spending great efforts solving the case, Otosan also secretly leads his organization into Hong Kong as he was unsatisfied with the previous assassination and plans to take action himself. Under his command, his underlings murder Yiu's wife, Monica (Chan Lik), and kidnap his son, Joe (Jacky Wong), in order to blackmail Yiu to killing Jade. Yiu helplessly executes Otosan's command and shoots and hijacks Jade, who was wearing a bulletproof vest, when she was being escorted by his team of CID, leading him to become a wanting criminal.

While avoiding being hunted by the police, Yiu also struggles to find the whereabouts of Otosan to save his kidnapped son. While on the process of pursuing Otosan with Yiu, Jade gradually regains her memory and reveals to Yiu that Otosan has planted a mole in the police force - Cheung. However, Yiu and Jade were puzzled by the question of why Cheung did not carry out the assassination of Yung since he was in charge of protecting him  for his stay in Hong Kong but Jade was chosen instead.

Cast
Simon Yam as Superintendent Charles Cheung
Alex Fong as Chief Inspector Tim Yiu
Hisako Shirata as Jade
Sonny Chiba as Otosan
Edwin Siu as Jack Chan
Crystal Kwok as Ada Chan
Samuel Pang as Glen
Eddy Ko as Police Commander Fung
Lam Suet as Mendosa
Joe Cheung as Senior Officer Kent Yung
Alexander Chan as Officer Ken Ma
Zac Ko as Motoki
Wong Mei-yin as Tina
Chan Man-lei as Uncle Suen
Lee Lam-yan as Marco
Roderick Lam as Ken
Johnnie Guy as Ronald Smith
Law Yau-kuen as Kent Yung's secretary
Jacky Wong as Joe
Mark Le Gartha as Basung Kawoma
Mark Zetterlund as Luther
Murata Hiroki as Daiki
Ho Sze-ting as Lina
Chan Lik as Monica
Lau Ching-lam as Hoko Mart
Kamiyama Norihisa as Jade's father
Risa Kosetsuki as Jade's mother
Lam Kwok-kit as Smith's bodyguard
Rick Smith as Macau official
Kawoma as Ahmed
Alan Ng as Glen's man
Benjamin Yuen as Glen's man
Suzuki Taukya as Otosan's man 
Nishimura Shin as Otosan's man 
Paul Logan as Otosan's man 
Lau Tin-lung as Otosan's man 
Luk Chun-kwong as Otosan's man 
Alex Cheng as Otosan's man 
Pang Wai-ming as Tom's subordinate
fong Chi-kui as Tom's subordinate
Woo Shui-chuen as Tom's subordinate
Lau Hing-kuen as Tom's subordinate
Adam Chan as Charles's subordinate
Vincent Chik as Charles's subordinate
Lee Miu-mak as Charles's subordinate
Wong Chun-man as Otosan's bodyguard
Tony Lui as Priest
John Cheung as Neurologist treating Jade
Ng Kim-wai as Underground doctor
Che Kim-fai as Macau's special force
Luk Man-wai as Macau's special force
Eddie Che as Macau's special force
Wong Ho-kwan as Macau's special force
Wong Kin-chung as Macau's special force
Cheng Wai-kei as Airport police
Yip Seung-hung as Airport police
Victy Wong as Special force driver
Lui Siu-ming as Special force driver
Joyce as Newscaster
Hon Ping

Reception

Critical
Andrew Chan of the Film Critics Circle of Australia rated the film a score of 8.75/10 and praised the film's plot and acting and director Sam Leong's original use of camera angles and shots. LoveHKFilm praises the performances of Simon Yam, Alex Fong and Hisako Shirata, the films' pacing, tone and emotions but criticizes the inconsistent language but overall, considers the film engaging. Beyond Hollywood praises the film's action sequences, but criticizes its predictable and unoriginal plot and the casting choice of Shirata.

Box office
The film grossed HK$346,565 during its theatrical run from 4 to 24 November 2004.

References

External links

Explosive City at Hong Kong Cinemagic

2004 films
2004 action thriller films
Hong Kong action thriller films
Police detective films
2000s Cantonese-language films
Films about terrorism
Films about amnesia
Films about assassinations
Films set in Hong Kong
Films shot in Hong Kong
Films set in Macau
Films shot in Macau
2000s Hong Kong films